Sir Godfrey Vassall Webster, 5th Baronet (6 October 1789 – 17 July 1836) was an English Tory Member of Parliament (MP).

Webster succeeded to the baronetcy in May 1800.

He was elected at the 1812 general election as an MP for Sussex. He was re-elected in 1818, and held the seat until the 1820 general election, when he did not stand again in Sussex.

References

External links 
 

1789 births
1836 deaths
Baronets in the Baronetage of England
Tory MPs (pre-1834)
Members of the Parliament of the United Kingdom for English constituencies
UK MPs 1812–1818
UK MPs 1818–1820